Downton could be

Places
Downton, Hampshire, England
Downton, Herefordshire, England
Downton, Powys, Wales
Downton, Shropshire, England
Downton, Wiltshire, England
Downton (UK Parliament constituency), a former parliament constituency in Wiltshire
Downton, Devon, England
Mount Downton, a volcanic peak in British Columbia, Canada
Downton Lake, a reservoir in British Columbia, Canada

Other uses
Downton (surname)
Downton F.C., a football club based in Wiltshire, England

See also

Downton Abbey, a British television period drama
Downton Abbey (film), a British film period drama
Downton Castle, an 18th-century country house at Downton on the Rock, Herefordshire
Downton pump
Downtown (disambiguation)
Down (disambiguation)